Volodarsky (Volodar) is a rural locality (a settlement) and the administrative center of Volodarsky District of Astrakhan Oblast, Russia. Population:

References

Notes

Sources

Rural localities in Volodarsky District, Astrakhan Oblast